Santi-Veena is the title of two Thai films, both directed by Tawee Na Bangchang (Marut) and written by Vichit Kounavudhi:
 Santi-Veena (1954 film), a 1954 film produced by Rattana Pestonji
 Santi-Veena (1976 film), a 1976 remake